The 6th Canadian Folk Music Awards were held on November 20, 2010, at the Pantages Playhouse Theatre in Winnipeg, Manitoba.

Nominees and recipients
Recipients are listed first and highlighted in boldface.

References

External links
Canadian Folk Music Awards

06
Canadian Folk Music Awards
Canadian Folk Music Awards
Canadian Folk Music Awards
Canadian Folk Music Awards